Andriy Kukharuk (born 13 December 1995) is a Ukrainian professional footballer who plays as a midfielder for FC Inhulets Petrove.

Career
Kukharuk is a product of the FC Ternopil and FC Sevastopol youth systems.

He signed a contract with Rukh Lviv in August 2020 and made his debut against FC Vorskla Poltava on 23 August 2020 in the Ukrainian Premier League.

References

External links
Statistics at UAF website (Ukr)
 

1995 births
Living people
Sportspeople from Ternopil
Ukrainian footballers
FC Sevastopol players
FC Sevastopol-2 players
FC Nyva Ternopil players
FC Sambir players
FC Ahrobiznes Volochysk players
FC Rukh Lviv players
FC Mariupol players
FC Inhulets Petrove players
Ukrainian expatriate footballers
Expatriate footballers in Austria
Ukrainian expatriate sportspeople in Austria
Ukrainian Premier League players
Ukrainian First League players
Ukrainian Second League players
Association football midfielders